Aleksander Stawarz codename: Leśnik, Baca (7 August 1896, Nowy Targ - 28 January 1941, Auschwitz) was a Polish Army Colonel.

In the First World War Stawarz served in Polish Legions. Since 1918 in the Polish Army he took part in the Polish-Bolshevik war, he distinguished himself during street fights in Minsk and the battle of Kalinówka. 

During the Second World War Stawarz was commander of the "2nd Highland Brigade" of the Army Karpaty. From 1939 until 1941 he was the founder and commander of the resistance unit "Dywizja Podhalańska", which was part of the ZWZ.

He was arrested by the Gestapo and murdered in the German concentration camp Auschwitz.

1896 births
1941 deaths
People from Nowy Targ
Polish Austro-Hungarians
People from the Kingdom of Galicia and Lodomeria
Polish legionnaires (World War I)
Polish people of the Polish–Soviet War
Polish Army officers
Polish resistance members of World War II
Polish people who died in Auschwitz concentration camp
Military personnel who died in Nazi concentration camps
Polish military personnel of World War II
Resistance members who died in Nazi concentration camps